Stephen Albert "Steve" Macknowski (February 16, 1922 – April 4, 2013) is an American sprint canoeist who competed in the late 1940s.

At the 1948 Summer Olympics in London, he won two medals with Steven Lysak with a gold in the C-2 10000 m event and a silver in the C-2 1000 m events. A native of Yonkers, New York, Macknowski attended Columbia University and later became an insurance agent. He died on April 4, 2013, aged 91.

References

 

1922 births
2013 deaths
American male canoeists
Canoeists at the 1948 Summer Olympics
Columbia University alumni
Olympic gold medalists for the United States in canoeing
Sportspeople from Yonkers, New York
Olympic medalists in canoeing
Medalists at the 1948 Summer Olympics